La Villa River is a river of Panama, in the province of Los Santos in the peninsula of Azuero. It arises in the province of Herrera in a national park, the Montuoso. It forms the border between Herrera and Los Santos and is an important source of drinking water for both provinces. The water also is used for irrigation. La Villa de Los Santos is at the left edge of the river.

See also
List of rivers of Panama

References

 Rand McNally, The New International Atlas, 1993.
CIA map, 1995.

Rivers of Panama